Barlil is a rural locality in the South Burnett Region, Queensland, Australia.

Geography 
Barlil was on the Murgon-to-Proston railway line. At Barlil, the  Windera railway line branched off towards Windera. Both lines are now closed.

History 
The locality's name is taken from the railway station name, which is an Aboriginal word meaning bend in a river, assigned by the Queensland Railways Department on 30 August 1923.

On Saturday 28 March 1925, the railway line from Barlil to Windera was officially opened by Alfred James Jones, the Minister for Mines and formerly the Member of the Queensland Legislative Assembly for Burnett.

Barlil State School opened on 15 September 1925. It closed on 1963. The school was located at 342 Paul Holznagel Road (just north of Silverleaf Road).  It provided primary school education for children residing in the immediate Barlil district, the town of Byee and nearby districts of Warnung and Gueena.

References 

South Burnett Region
Localities in Queensland